The 1953 Divizia B was the 14th season of the second tier of the Romanian football league system.

The format with two series has been maintained, but each of them being expanded from 12 to 16. At the end of the season the winners of the series and one second place promoted to Divizia A and only the teams which had organizational problems relegated to District Championship, because the series would be expanded from the next season. This was the fourth season played in the spring-autumn system, a system imposed by the new leadership of the country which were in close ties with the Soviet Union.

Team changes

To Divizia B
Promoted from District Championship
 Avântul Reghin
 Dinamo Bacău
 Dinamo Turnu Măgurele
 Locomotiva Craiova
 Metalul Brăila
 Metalul Hunedoara
 Metalul Reșița
 Șantierul Constanța

Relegated from Divizia A
 Flacăra Ploiești
 Metalul Câmpia Turzii

From Divizia B
Relegated to District Championship
 —

Promoted to Divizia A
 Locomotiva GR București
 Știința Timișoara

Renamed teams 
Flacăra Lupeni was renamed as Minerul Lupeni.

Flacăra Poiana Câmpina was renamed as Metalul Câmpina.

Înainte Sibiu was renamed as Libertatea Sibiu.

League tables

Serie I

Serie II

See also 

 1953 Divizia A

References

Liga II seasons
Romania
Romania
2
2